Steigerwald is a surname. Notable people with the surname include:

Bill Steigerwald, American author and former journalist. 
John Steigerwald (born 1948), American sports reporter, commentator and former sports anchor
Paul Steigerwald (born 1954), American sportscaster
Peter Steigerwald, American comic book artist